William John Carter (21 January 1841 – 18 November 1888) was an English cricketer. Carter was a right-handed batsman who bowled right-arm fast. He was born at Kennington, Surrey.

Carter made his first-class debut for Surrey against the Kent in 1871 at The Oval. He made six further first-class appearances for the county, the last of which came against Gloucestershire in 1874. In his seven first-class matches for the county, he scored 77 runs at an average of 8.55, with a high score of 21 not out. With the ball, he took 4 wickets at a bowling average of 10.25, with best figures of 2/15. He also made a single first-class appearance in 1874 for a United South of England Eleven against Yorkshire at Great Horton Road, Bradford.

He died at Kingston upon Thames, Surrey, on 18 November 1888.

References

External links
William Carter at ESPNcricinfo
William Carter at CricketArchive

1841 births
1888 deaths
People from Kennington
English cricketers
Surrey cricketers
United South of England Eleven cricketers